Callirhoe digitata, the fringed poppy mallow or standing wine cup, is a species of flowering plant in the family Malvaceae, native to the U.S. states of Kansas, Oklahoma, Missouri, Arkansas, and Alabama, and introduced to Illinois. A perennial with magenta flowers, in the wild it prefers to grow in sunny areas with drier, more alkaline soils. Recommended for both formal and informal plantings, it is hardy in USDA zones 5 through 8, and once established it is drought resistant.

References

digitata
Garden plants of North America
Endemic flora of the United States
Flora of Kansas
Flora of Oklahoma
Flora of Missouri
Flora of Arkansas
Flora of Alabama
Plants described in 1821